Sand Hills is a census-designated place (CDP) in Muskogee County, Oklahoma, United States. The population was 422 at the 2000 census.

Geography
Sand Hills is located at  (35.631684, -95.191132).

Demographics

As of the census of 2000, there were 422 people, 160 households, and 123 families residing in the CDP. The population density was 55.2 people per square mile (21.3/km2). There were 169 housing units at an average density of 22.1/sq mi (8.5/km2). The racial makeup of the CDP was 70.14% White, 18.96% Native American, 0.47% from other races, and 10.43% from two or more races. Hispanic or Latino of any race were 0.47% of the population.

There were 160 households, out of which 35.6% had children under the age of 18 living with them, 65.6% were married couples living together, 10.6% had a female householder with no husband present, and 23.1% were non-families. 20.6% of all households were made up of individuals, and 8.1% had someone living alone who was 65 years of age or older. The average household size was 2.64 and the average family size was 3.02.

In the CDP, the population was spread out, with 27.5% under the age of 18, 8.3% from 18 to 24, 27.7% from 25 to 44, 25.8% from 45 to 64, and 10.7% who were 65 years of age or older. The median age was 36 years. For every 100 females, there were 93.6 males. For every 100 females age 18 and over, there were 87.7 males.

The median income for a household in the CDP was $29,167, and the median income for a family was $34,167. Males had a median income of $29,028 versus $24,091 for females. The per capita income for the CDP was $14,609. About 11.3% of families and 13.5% of the population were below the poverty line, including 14.3% of those under age 18 and 25.0% of those age 65 or over.

References

Census-designated places in Muskogee County, Oklahoma
Census-designated places in Oklahoma